Jacob Bojsen-Møller (born 26 April 1956) is a Danish sailor. He competed at the 1980 Summer Olympics and the 1984 Summer Olympics.

References

External links
 

1956 births
Living people
Danish male sailors (sport)
Olympic sailors of Denmark
Sailors at the 1980 Summer Olympics – Flying Dutchman
Sailors at the 1984 Summer Olympics – Flying Dutchman
People from Vordingborg Municipality
Sportspeople from Region Zealand